The Mission Covenant Church of Norway (Norwegian: , formerly , DNM ), is an assembly of dissident or liberated Christian churches founded in 1884 after being instigated to do so by the Swedish-American evangelist Fredrik Franson. Gustav Adolph Lammers, the role model for Ibsen's Brand, is perceived as the spiritual father of the Mission Covenant Church of Norway. Today it comprises ninety-nine independent churches scattered all over Norway.

The Mission Covenant Church of Norway is registered as a separate denomination, but each individual with the association has the freedom to practice the beliefs of their respective Norwegian Church groups. Each member is also free to practice their own forms of Holy Communion and baptism (infant baptism vs. adult baptism).

Among the work being done in churches are: church services, Sunday schools, scout, and youth associations. The Mission Covenant Church of Norway predominantly emphasizes evangelism and missionary work. The Mission Covenant Church of Norway has about eight-thousand two hundred registered members – in addition to those who have chosen to remain as members of the Church of Norway. 
Stagedive is a camp that the Mission Covenant Church of Norway organizes each year and is held all over Norway for youths between twelve and sixteen years.

Henrik Ibsen's Brand
The first dissident congregation in Norway was established in effect of the priest in Skien Gustav Adolph Lammers resigning his post. Lammers is perceived as a role model for the character Brand in the play of the same name. Ibsen's mother and especially his sister, Hedvig, were ardent followers of Lammers. The Mission Covenant Church in Skien is seen as the direct offspring of this dissident congregation.

Overseas missions
In Hong Kong and Macau, the church is known by its Chinese name: .

References

External links
The Mission Covenant Church of Norway - Mainpage
The Mission Covenant Church of Norway - Mainpage (Old Version) 
The Mission Covenant Church of Norway - Hong Kong field website 
- Macau field website

Churches in Norway
Christian missionary societies
Protestantism in Norway